George Finch may refer to: 

 George Finch, 9th Earl of Winchilsea (1752–1826), politician
 George Finch (1794–1870), MP for Lymington, Stamford and Rutland, illegitimate son of above
 George Finch (1835–1907), MP for Rutland, son of the above 
 George Finch (chemist) (1888–1970), chemist and mountaineer
 George Finch (architect) (1930–2013), architect
 George G. Finch (1902–?), US Air National Guard general

See also
 George Finch-Hatton (disambiguation)
 Finch (surname)